Sprint International may refer to:

 Sprint Corporation, telecommunications company
 The International (golf), golf tournament